, the Orthodox Church of Ukraine is subdivided into forty-five eparchies:

In Ukraine

Liquidated or not registered 
 Eparchy of Pereyaslav and Bila Tserkva (UOC-KP) - abandoned
 Eparchy of Dnipropetrovsk and Zaporizhia (UAOC) - not registered
 Eparchy of Khmelnytskyi (UAOC) - not registered
 Eparchy of Cherkasy and Kirovohrad (UAOC) - not registered
 Eparchy of Kyiv (UAOC) - not registered
 Eparchy of Lviv and Sambir (UAOC) - not registered
 Eparchy of Odesa and Black Sea (UAOC) - unofficial
 East Moldovan Eparchy (UOC-KP) - turned to Romanian Orthodox Church

See also 
 Eparchies and Metropolitanates of the Russian Orthodox Church
 Eparchies of the Romanian Orthodox Church
 Eparchies of the Serbian Orthodox Church
 List of Catholic dioceses (structured view)

References 

 
Ukraine
Orthodox Church of Ukraine
Ukraine religion-related lists